Eaglehawk Neck, officially Teralina / Eaglehawk Neck, is a narrow isthmus that connects the Tasman Peninsula with the Forestier Peninsula and hence to the rest of Tasmania, Australia.

Location and features
The location features rugged terrain and several unusual geological formations including the Tessellated Pavement. Clyde Island, at the northern entry to Pirates Bay, is accessible for crossings at low tide and is the site of two graves, and a rumbling blow hole that cleaves the island.

Eaglehawk Neck is a holiday destination. On the eastern side, a beach that stretches around Pirates' Bay is a popular surfing area. In summer the population rises as people return to their holiday homes.

European history
Eaglehawk Neck was gazetted as a locality in 1967. It was dual named as of March 2021 to represent its original name Teralina.

The Dog Line
As Eaglehawk Neck forms a natural thin gateway between the peninsulas, it was used by the British as a place to stop convicts attempting to escape from Port Arthur and other penal institutions on the Tasman Peninsula. A system was developed where a line of dogs were chained to posts across the "Neck" to warn of any convicts attempting to escape. The Dog Line was first implemented in 1831 and was used until the closure of Port Arthur in the 1870s.

Thomas J. Lempriere, a commissary officer at Port Arthur, declared the Eaglehawk Neck as "impassable". Despite this, many attempts were made by convicts to escape from the Tasman Peninsula via Eaglehawk Neck, including Martin Cash and William Bannon. The area was heavily patrolled by soldiers, and the guards' quarters still remains as a museum.

The isthmus now provides road access via the Arthur Highway to Port Arthur, part of the Australian Convict Sites, a World Heritage Site that comprises eleven remnant penal sites originally built within the British Empire during the 18th and 19th centuries on fertile Australian coastal strips. Collectively, these sites, including Port Arthur, now represent, "...the best surviving examples of large-scale penal transportation and the colonial expansion of European powers through the presence and labour of convicts".

Post office
The first Eagle Hawk Neck post office was open from 1875 until 1877. A post office opened on 11 January 1895 and closed in 1974.

Geography
The shores of Norfolk Bay and Eaglehawk Neck form the western boundary, while the Tasman Sea forms the eastern.

Road infrastructure
The A9 route (Arthur Highway) enters from the north and runs through to the south-west, where it exits. Route C338 (Blowhole Road / Tasmans Arch Road) starts at an intersection with A9 in the centre and runs south-east until it ends at Tasman Arch.

See also

 Clydes Island
 Geography of Tasmania

References

Further reading

External links
Eaglehawk Neck at walkabout.com.au
Eaglehawk Neck

Forestier Peninsula
Localities of Tasman Council
Isthmuses of Oceania